Laxmikant Sharma (1960/1961 – May 31, 2021) was an Indian politician.

Biography
Sharma was a member of the Madhya Pradesh Legislative Assembly elected from Sironj.

During the Vyapam investigation he was placed in judicial custody. He served as minister for Education of Madhya Pradesh and leader of Bharatiya Janata Party.

He was one of the accused in the Vyapam scam.

Sharma died at Chirayu Hospital in Bhopal, where he was being treated for COVID-19, aged 60.

References

1960s births
2021 deaths
Madhya Pradesh MLAs 2008–2013
People from Vidisha district
State cabinet ministers of Madhya Pradesh
Bharatiya Janata Party politicians from Madhya Pradesh
Year of birth missing
Deaths from the COVID-19 pandemic in India